Hmiss (Arabic: حميص) or ifelfel, meaning "chilli pepper" in Kabylia, or felfla in the region of Oran, is a traditional Algerian salad made from grilled peppers and tomatoes, chopped, mixed and seasoned with olive oil. The word "Hmiss" means sauté in Algerian Darja, because the vegetables have to be sautéd after grilling.

Description 
Hmiss is prepared everywhere in Algeria, with small differences from one region to another. Thus, in eastern Algeria, it is prepared with garlic, tomatoes and grilled peppers. It's cooked by putting the garlic, the chopped tomatoes and the oil in a frying pan for a few minutes, adding the peppers and crushing everything in a wooden mortar (the mehras). It is then served on a plate.

This entry is accompanied by aghroum or kesra bread. In Kabylia, it is prepared with the same vegetables, then seasoned with olive oil, sometimes beaten eggs are added at the end, mixed and left to cook very slowly. In Tlemcen, it is prepared with olive oil, peppers, tomatoes, garlic, eggs, coriander and it is flavored with caraway.

Algerian cuisine
African cuisine
Arab cuisine
Maghrebi cuisine
Mediterranean cuisine